John Baldwin Raymond (December 5, 1844 – January 3, 1886) was a Delegate from Dakota Territory to the United States House of Representatives.  He was born in Lockport, Niagara County, New York, then moved with his parents to Tazewell County, Illinois in 1853.  He served in the Union Army in the Illinois Thirty-First Regiment during the American Civil War, being promoted to Captain for action at the Battle of Vicksburg.

Following the war Raymond settled in Mississippi.  He published the Mississippi Pilot newspaper at Jackson, Mississippi during Reconstruction.  He was assistant State treasurer of Mississippi, and was appointed United States marshal of Dakota Territory in 1877, with headquarters at Yankton and later at Fargo.

He was elected as a Republican to the House, serving from March 4, 1883 - March 3, 1885.  He was an unsuccessful candidate for renomination in 1884, and engaged in wheat farming.  He died in Fargo, and was interred in the public vault in Rock Creek Cemetery, Washington, D.C.

External links

1844 births
1886 deaths
Politicians from Lockport, New York
People of Illinois in the American Civil War
Editors of Mississippi newspapers
Delegates to the United States House of Representatives from Dakota Territory
United States Marshals
Burials at Rock Creek Cemetery
Union Army officers
19th-century American politicians